The USCGC Escanaba (WPG-77) was a  "A" type United States Coast Guard cutter stationed on the Great Lakes from her commissioning in 1932 until the start of U.S. military involvement in World War II in 1941.  With the outbreak of war, Escanaba redeployed to participate in the Battle of the Atlantic, during the course of which she was ultimately lost with nearly all hands.  Struck by either a torpedo or mine in the early morning of 13 June 1943, while serving as a convoy escort, Escanaba suffered a fiery explosion and sank within minutes, leaving only two survivors and one body out of her 105-man crew to be found on the surface by rescuers.

Construction
Escanaba was built at Bay City, Michigan by the Defoe Shipbuilding Company with contract for her construction signed 10 November 1931 at a cost of $525,550. She was one of six  "A" type cutters designed as a light icebreaker and her type were the first Coast Guard cutters to have a geared-turbine drive. The double-reduction DeLaval geared-turbine was powered by two Babcock & Wilcox main boilers which produced 1500 shaft horsepower. The ship carried 41500 gallons of oil to fire her boilers.

Great Lakes service

Escanaba, named for the city and river in the Upper Peninsula of Michigan, was built at the Defoe Shipbuilding Company in Bay City, Michigan in 1932.  The six cutters of her class were designed primarily for light ice breaking, rescue, and law enforcement duties.  She was commissioned on 23 November 1932 in Grand Haven, Michigan, which would be her permanent station and home port until she was redeployed to the East Coast for combat duty in the Second World War.  Escanaba'''s primary, pre-war missions were ice breaking and search and rescue on the Great Lakes, which caused her to become well known throughout the region and a beloved part of her home port's community.  During this period, from 1932 to 1934, future USCG Commandant Edwin J. Roland served aboard Escanaba as gunnery officer and navigator.

In the winter of 1934, Escanaba  rescued the crew of the lake freighter  after running aground at Muskegon.

World War II

Greenland Patrol service

With the outbreak of war in 1941, Escanaba's home port was shifted to Boston, and she was assigned to the Greenland Patrol, performing escort duty and search and rescue operations in the North Atlantic.  

On 15 June 1942, while escorting convoy XB-25 from Cape Cod to Halifax, Escanaba had two submarine contacts and made attacks on them.  No sinkings were confirmed.  After making these attacks, the ship rescued 20 people from the SS Cherokee, which had been sunk by a U-boat.  In that same month, Escanaba was credited with the sinkings of two enemy submarines in a single day.

From 1 July until 23 August 1942, she was on weather patrol.

SS Dorchester rescues
The rescue was marked by the Escanaba's historic first use of rescue swimmers clad in survival suits to aid survivors, who were too weakened by shock or hypothermia in the icy water to pull themselves up cargo nets or sea ladders to the safety and warmth of rescuers' ships, or even to hold on to ropes cast to them from the rescue vessel. By way of the lines the rescue swimmers tied around those who were having trouble helping themselves, many struggling survivors who--debilitated by the cold--would have otherwise died, were hauled aboard the Escanaba by crewmen on deck. Even those in the water who appeared to be dead were harnessed by the retrieval swimmers and pulled aboard – it was found that only 12 of the 50 apparently dead victims thus brought aboard by the retrieval teams actually turned out to be dead. The rest proved themselves to be quite alive once given the benefit of warmth, dryness, and medical attention.

In all, Escanaba plucked 133 survivors from the water that day, only one of whom went on to die aboard the cutter after rescue.  For their work in supervising and organizing the rescue, commanding officer Lieutenant Commander Carl U. Peterson received the Legion of Merit and executive officer Lieutenant Robert H. Prause Jr., whose experiments in a tethered rubber suit off a dock at Bluie West One had paved the way for this new "retriever method," received a letter of commendation. Ship's doctor Assistant Surgeon Ralph R. Nix of the US Public Health Service also received a letter of commendation for his work saving the lives of the critically chilled survivors.  Three crew members who went "over the side" to bring in survivors, Ensign Richard A. Arrighi, Ship's Cook 2nd Class Forrest O. Rednour, and Steward's Mate 3rd Class Warren T. Deyampert, were awarded the Navy and Marine Corps Medal for their actions in the water.  All decorations and commendations, however, were to be awarded posthumously.

Sinking of Escanaba
On 10 June 1943, Escanaba began escorting her last convoy, GS-24 from Narsarssuak to St. John's, Newfoundland, in company with the Mojave (Flag), Tampa, Storis, and Algonquin.  The vessels they were tasked to escort were USAT Fairfax and the tug USS Raritan.

At 0510 on 13 June, a large sheet of flame and dense smoke were seen rising from the Escanaba, though no explosion was heard by the other ships in the convoy.  She sank at 0513, going down so quickly that she did not have time to send any distress signals.  Storis and Raritan were ordered to investigate and rescue survivors while the rest of the convoy began zigzagging and steering evasive courses to avoid enemy submarines.  Although Storis and Raritan were able to arrive on the scene within ten minutes, only two survivors and one body could be found.  At 0715 the two vessels returned to the main body of the convoy, having rescued Boatswain's Mate 2nd Class Melvin A. Baldwin and Seaman 1st Class Raymond F. O'Malley Jr., and having found the body of LT Prause.  The entire crew of 13 officers and 92 men was lost to the explosion or to rapid hypothermia in the  water with the exception of Baldwin and O'Malley, whose survival was attributed to their soaked clothing having frozen their unconscious bodies to floating debris, which prevented them from following their shipmates to the bottom.

The exact cause of the explosion could not be determined at the time, but was commonly attributed to a torpedo fired by one of several U-boats which were in the area at the time.  However, no U-boats claimed the kill, and, according to Browning, it is now considered more probable that the cutter was sunk by a drifting mine.

Legacy

The city of Grand Haven was hit hard emotionally by the loss of "its" cutter.  As the war wore on, the citizens of Grand Haven managed to raise more than $1,000,000 in bonds to build a new cutter bearing the same name (USCGC Escanaba (WHEC-64)) in order to honor the ill-fated ship and its men. The third Escanaba (WMEC-907) was commissioned in 1987 and is currently based in Boston, the final home port of her namesake.  In 1949, the city renamed Kelly Memorial Park to Escanaba Park to honor ship and her crew.  Each year during the Coast Guard Festival, the city holds a memorial service to honor the sacrifice of the 103 men who were lost with Escanaba''.

Notes

Citations

References cited

  
 
 
  
The Coast Guard at War, Transports and Escorts, CGC Escanaba (WPG-77)

Ships of the United States Coast Guard
History of the United States Coast Guard
Ships built in Bay City, Michigan
World War II shipwrecks in the Atlantic Ocean
Ships sunk by German submarines in World War II
1932 ships
Maritime incidents in June 1943